"Get My Love!" is a song by Japanese dance unit, MAX. It is a Japanese cover of "Take My Gum" by Italo disco artist, Dolly. It was composed by Syrups with Japanese lyrics written by Yuko Ebine and was released as the fifth and final single from their debut album, Maximum (1996). Upon release the song debuted and peaked at #4, becoming the group's first top 5 single.

Until 2005's "Nirai Kanai," the song was the last Eurobeat song by the group to be released as a single.

Track listing

References

1996 singles
MAX (band) songs
Song recordings produced by Max Matsuura
1996 songs
Avex Trax singles